Andreas Mayer may refer to:

 Andreas Mayer (footballer, born 1972), German footballer
 Andreas Mayer (footballer, born 1980), German footballer

See also  
 Andreas Meyer (disambiguation)